John Benson may refer to:

Arts and entertainment
 John Benson (publisher) (died 1667), English publisher of Shakespeare's works
 John Benson (architect) (1812–1874), Irish architect
 John Prentiss Benson (1865–1947), American artist
 John Howard Benson (1901–1956), American calligrapher and stonecarver
 John Benson (artisan) (born 1939), American calligrapher and stonecarver, designer of the typeface Alexa

Sports
 John Benson (footballer, born 1942) (1942–2010), Scottish footballer
 John Benson (tennis) (born 1959), American tennis player
 Johnny Benson Jr. (born 1963), American racing driver
 John Benson (footballer, born 1991), Ghanaian footballer

Others
 John Benson (clockmaker) (died 1790), English clockmaker
 John Robinson Benson (1836–1885), Australian politician in Queensland
 John Ernest Benson (1911–1989), Australian engineer and researcher 
 John T. Benson (born 1937), American educator
 John Benson (Minnesota politician) (born 1943), American politician, member of the Minnesota House of Representatives

See also
 John Benson Brooks (1917–1999), American jazz pianist, songwriter and composer